Sound Eroticism is a 1986 Hungarian comedy film directed by Péter Tímár.

Synopsis 
Fireman Bozodi arrives to a countryside factory manufacturing wooden crates; headed by foreman Falkay, the factory, consisting entirely of women, is struggling to sell the unnecessary amount of crates produced. Looking to benefit from the obvious apathy, Bozodi convinces Falkay to install a surveillance camera into the women's dressing room; they then invite business partners to view the live feed of women disrobing, under the condition that they purchase large amounts of crates, causing the business to suddenly surge. 

While decorating for an August 20 national holiday event, the women accidentally discover the camera, organize a strike and take Bozodi and Falkay hostage, demanding answers from the president of the company, who has just arrived for the holiday celebration. The president, hoping to distract from the incident, enlists his friend, the local fire chief, to set fire to the back of the factory, assuming the fire will cause the women to flee. Unfortunately, due to the combination of wooden crates quickly catching fire and Bozodi using the fire extinguishers to smuggle petrol, the factory quickly burns to the ground.

Cast 
 Ádám Rajhona - Falkay Gábor, foreman
 Róbert Koltai - Bozodi János, fireman
 Péter Haumann - President
 Judit Németh - Hajdúné
 Kata Kristóf - Ibike
 Györgyi Kari - University student
 István Mikó - Secretary of the Party
 József Sótonyi - Doc
 György Hunyadkürthy - Fire chief
 Frigyes Hollósi
 János Derzsi

Production 
The film was Péter Tímár's directorial debut; the script came together as a combination of his previous short films, and stories he heard from producer Péter Bacsó. He decided to shoot film with actors acting out the scenes backwards; the footage was then flipped during edit, causing the actors to act in an odd jerky motion resembling of early silent movies; while initially apprehensive, he was relieved to find that the actors found the dailies hilarious. Tímár also composed music of the film on a single analogue drum machine, which he found appropriate to a film about a factory.

References

External links 

1986 comedy films
1986 films
Hungarian comedy films